The Lure of the Atlantic is a 1929 British silent drama film directed by Norman Lee and starring Eric Hales, Iris Darbyshire and John St. John. It was made at Isleworth Studios.

Cast
 Eric Hales as The Reporter  
 Iris Darbyshire as The Wife  
 John St. John as The Gambler  
 Fletcher Lightfoot as Alcock  
 Rexford Burnett as Brown

References

Bibliography
 Low, Rachael. Filmmaking in 1930s Britain. George Allen & Unwin, 1985.
 Wood, Linda. British Films, 1927-1939. British Film Institute, 1986.

External links

1929 films
British drama films
British silent feature films
1929 drama films
Films directed by Norman Lee
Films shot at Isleworth Studios
British black-and-white films
1920s English-language films
1920s British films
Silent drama films